Contracts of Employment (Indigenous Workers) Convention may refer to:

Contracts of Employment (Indigenous Workers) Convention, 1939 (shelved), International Labour Organization convention from 1939 to 1948
Contracts of Employment (Indigenous Workers) Convention, 1947 (shelved), International Labour Organization convention from 1947 to 1953